Abílio Almeida Cabral (born 23 February 1960) is an Angolan boxer. He competed in the men's featherweight event at the 1980 Summer Olympics. At the 1980 Summer Olympics, he lost to Fitzroy Brown of Guyana.

References

External links
 

1960 births
Living people
Angolan male boxers
Olympic boxers of Angola
Boxers at the 1980 Summer Olympics
Place of birth missing (living people)
Featherweight boxers